Aram Quartet was an Italian musical group that won the title after taking part in the first Italian edition of the talent show X Factor. The band split in 2010.

The group was composed of:
 Antonio Ancora b. 11 April 1981 in Galatina
 Raffaele Simone b. 4 May 1974 in Lecce
 Antonio Maggio b. 8 August 1986 in San Pietro Vernotico
 Michele Cortese b. 27 September 1985 in Gallipoli.

The name Aram comes from the first letter of the names of the members of the "quartet". They were mentored during the series by Morgan and their vocal coach was Gaudi. They won a contract from Sony BMG estimated at 300,000 Euros.

Their first EP ChiARAMente was released on 18 July 2008 and reached FIMI (Federazione Industria Musicale Italiana) Albums charts at #9. Their first single was "Chi (Who)" reaching position 5 in the Italian Singles Chart. A cover of "Per Elisa" was released by Aram Quartet and reached position 6 in the Italian Singles Chart.

In 2009 they realised their first long album, Il pericolo di essere liberi.

Discography

Albums

EPs

Singles

Other songs
2009: "Un'Emozione da Poco"

References

Sony BMG artists
The X Factor winners
X Factor (Italian TV series) contestants
Musical groups disestablished in 2010
Musical groups from Apulia